Corinne Vezzoni (born 21 March 1964) is a French architect.

Vezzoni founded Agence Corinne Vezzoni & Associés at Marseille in 2000.

Vezzoni is an instructor in planning and development at the University of Provence.

In 2015, she was awarded the Prix Femmes Architectes. Vezzoni was named a Chevalier in the Ordre des Arts et des Lettres.

Selected projects 
 
 Centre de conservation et de ressources of the Museum of European and Mediterranean Civilisations
 Lycée Haute Qualité Environnementale at Vence
  metro station at Marseille

References 

1964 births
Living people
People from Arles
French women architects
Academic staff of the University of Provence
Chevaliers of the Ordre des Arts et des Lettres
Members of the Académie d'architecture
20th-century French architects
21st-century French architects
20th-century French women
21st-century French women